KRUC (88.9 FM, "Radio Cadena Manantial") is a non-commercial radio station licensed to serve Las Cruces, New Mexico.  The station is owned by World Radio Network, Inc.  It airs an evangelical, interdenominational Spanish language Religious radio format.

The station was assigned the KRUC call letters by the Federal Communications Commission on April 18, 1987. The station is a simulcast of KVER-FM in El Paso, Texas.

Translators

References

External links
Radio Cadena Manantial website

RUC
RUC
Astoria, Oregon
Mass media in Maricopa County, Arizona
Mass media in McAllen, Texas
Goshen, Indiana
Elkhart, Indiana
South Bend, Indiana
RUC
Radio stations established in 1987